The British Comic Art Convention (usually known by the moniker Comicon) was an annual British comic book convention which was held between 1968 and 1981, usually in London. The earliest British fan convention devoted entirely to comics, it was also the birthplace of the Eagle Awards.

Most editions of Comicon took place over two days, usually on a Saturday and Sunday. The convention featured floorspace for exhibitors, including comic book dealers and collectibles merchants. Along with panels, seminars, and workshops with comic book professionals, one of the highlights of Comicon was the Saturday all-night film show. Charity auctions of original comic book art were also usually held. Convention booklets produced in conjunction with each show featured original illustrations by comics professional and fanzine artists.

Early editions of the convention were intimate affairs where comics enthusiasts gathered to socialize, network, and educate each other about the form. As the convention evolved and grew, it increasingly focused on comics dealers and professional guests.

History
The first Comicon was organized by 18-year-old fanzine publisher Phil Clarke and was held 30 August – 2 September 1968 in Birmingham, England. (Clarke paid £111 of his own money to rent the venue for the show, the Midland Hotel.) The first show attracted both professional and amateur creators of the time, including, Paul Neary, Jim Baikie, Steve Moore, and Nick Landau. It also featured a "fancy dress" contest, in which contestants dressed up as characters from the comic books.

Comicon '69, held in London, was organized by retailer Bram Stokes, "Godfather of British fandom" Frank Dobson, and Steve Moore.

Comicon '70 was organized by Sam Plumb and held in Sheffield. 

Comicon '71 returned to London (where it mostly stayed from that point forward), and was organized by Bram Stokes and Dez Skinn. The guest of honor was Frank Bellamy. An underground comix panel featured cartoonist Edward Barker, and editors Mick Farren and Graham Keen. 

Comicon '72, the fifth annual show, was organized by Nick Landau/Comic Media. Attendees included comedian Bob Monkhouse and Monty Python member Terry Gilliam; Brian Bolland made his first professional contacts. The all-night film show was sponsored by the Electric Cinema Club and Richard Williams Films.

Comicon '73, planned and promoted by Bram Stokes and John Mansefield, was scheduled for the weekend of 21–22 July at London's Regent Centre Hotel, with special guests Frank Bellamy, Morris, James Warren, Peter O'Donnell, Bruce Pennington, Jim Cawthorne, Yaroslav Horak, Eddie Jones, Philippe Druillet, Jean Giraud, and Albert Weinberg (Dan Cooper). A cadre of famous American Marvel Comics comics creators — including Stan Lee, Jim Steranko, and Neal Adams — were also tentatively scheduled to appear. Films planned to be screened include a Star Trek blooper reel, Richard Corbens Neverwhere, an episode of The Avengers television show, and the U.F.O. television film. The event being abruptly canceled shortly before it was scheduled, however, the show was salvaged by Nick Landau and Rob Barrow, who by that time were promoters of the competing London Comic Mart shows. Landau and Barrow managed to put on a one-day Comicon on 22 July at the usual location of the Waverley Hotel. Barrow (and his corporate entity Fantasy Domain) organized the convention for at least the next four years.

Barrow's first solo convention, Comicon '74, was co-billed as "Comicon/Comic Mart Summer Special 1974." Returning to being a two-day affair, it was held at the Regent Centre Hotel. The only industry guest was Denis Gifford, who delivered a presentation. There was an all-night film show on Saturday, and films were shown Sunday evening as well.

The tenth anniversary show, Comicon '77, hosted the first presentation of the Eagle Awards, organized by Mike Conroy, Nick Landau, Fantasy Advertiser's Colin Campbell, Phil Clarke, and Richard Burton. The Comicon '77 program booklet featured interviews with special guests Brian Bolland and Dave Gibbons. A talk on the characters of Edgar Rice Burroughs was given by Frank Westwood of the British E.R.B. society, and Dez Skinn gave a slide show on the artist and the comic book. An underground comix panel featured Hunt Emerson and Chris Welch. 

1978 was a complicated year, as organizer Barrow scheduled two editions of the show: the main one in London, and a subsequent edition — "Comicon II" — in Birmingham. The convention booklet was produced by OVR Comics. Comicon II, the Birmingham edition, held September 2–3, 1978, at the Imperial Hotel, was a disaster. First of all, one of the guests of honor, Dave Cockrum, did not show up. Secondly, a local smallpox scare kept dealers and crowds away. Thirdly, there were mix-ups by the hotel. Nonetheless, Barrow went forward with the show, including film showings and panels. An underground comix slideshow was presented by Chris Welch and Hunt Emerson.

In 1979, long-time organizer Barrow turned his focus away from Comicon and toward his comic mart business in London and elsewhere. Ultimately, two Comicon '79s ended up taking place — one in London and one in the originating location of Birmingham. Comicon (London) 1979, the official "British Comic Art Convention 11," was sponsored by Valhalla Books of Ilford, Essex, and organized by Ian Starling, Neville Ferris, and Ian Knox (who promised future conventions, none of which seem to have occurred). It took place August 11-12, 1979, held at the Rembrandt Hotel, Thurloe Place. The guest of honor was Jim Starlin. The Birmingham edition of Comicon '79, officially known as the "U.K. Comic Art & Fantasy Convention," was organized by Rob Barrow's former convention partner Colin Campbell, previously the editor/publisher of Fantasy Advertiser (and later to become a co-owner of Forbidden Planet International). Campbell's convention was held August 31–September 2 at the Birmingham Metropole, National Exhibition Centre. The guest of honor was Jim Steranko, and other guests included Marshall Rogers, Chris Claremont, Terry Austin, Paul Levitz, Howard Chaykin, Len Wein, and Joe Staton.

The British Comic Art Convention did not take place in 1980. To fill the void, Starburst'' magazine (at that point owned by Marvel Comics) produced the Marvel Comics Film & Fantasy Convention, held at Lawrence Hall, London. True to its name, however, the show and its guests had very little connection to the comic book industry.

In the early months of 1981, flyers appeared at the Comicbook Marketplace promising a Comicon '81, but there were concerns that proper permissions to use the name had not been acquired. In the end, the final incarnation of Comicon was held in late October 1981 at the old location of London's Regent Centre Hotel, organized by Dez Skinn and Frank Dobson. Skinn and Dobson organized the show as a more intimate convention, "with the fan in mind;" an art exhibit featured comics from Alex Raymond to the present. In addition, the Saturday "ComiCon Banquet" featured the fifth annual presentation of the Eagle Awards, as well as the presentation of the Society of Strip Illustration Awards, and the Ally Sloper Award.

 Legacy 
The following year saw Comicana 82''', held in late September at London's Regent Crest Hotel. Produced by Rob Barrow's Fantasy Domain and Comic Showcase, the special guest was Frank Miller. The next British comics convention to be staged with any regularity was the United Kingdom Comic Art Convention (UKCAC), which was held annually from 1985 to 1998.

Locations and dates

References

External links 
 David Hine's blog post about Comicon '78
 CLASSIC UK COMICS ZINES: Convention Booklets, including almost all the Comicon programs 
 "Bellamy and the British comic conventions," Frank Bellamy Checklist Blog (July 2011)

British fan conventions
Defunct comics conventions
Recurring events established in 1968
Recurring events disestablished in 1981